The Bangladesh national cricket team toured Zimbabwe from 17 April 2013 to 12 May 2013. The tour consisted of two Test matches, three One Day Internationals and two Twenty20 International matches. Both test matches were played at the Harare Sports Club, Harare while the limited overs matches was played at the Queens Sports Club, Bulawayo.

Squads

Due to injuries, Rubel Hossain and Shahadat Hossain were replaced by Shafiul Islam and Ziaur Rahman for the second Test. Rubel Hossain was withdrawn from the ODI and T20 matches due to illness.

Test series

1st Test

2nd Test

ODI series

1st ODI

2nd ODI

3rd ODI

Twenty20 Series

1st Twenty20

2nd Twenty20

References

External links
 Coverage on Wisden India

2013 in Bangladeshi cricket
2013 in Zimbabwean cricket
2013
International cricket competitions in 2013
Zimbabwean cricket seasons from 2000–01